María del Perpetuo Socorro Guadalupe Susana Rul Riestra (9 January 1948 – 2 July 2022), known professionally as Susana Dosamantes, was a Mexican actress. She won the 1990 TVyNovelas Best Antagonist Actress award for her role in the 1989 telenovela, Morir para vivir.

From 1968 onwards, she worked in around 50 movies and television series, including a number of Spanish-language soap operas.

Personal life 
María del Perpetuo Socorro Guadalupe Susana Rul Riestra was born on 9 January 1948 in Guadalajara, Mexico. She was the daughter of Mario Rul and María Elena Susana Riestra Alcaraz.

She was the mother of Mexican pop diva Paulina Rubio.

Death 
Dosamantes died on 2 July 2022 at the age of 74, due to pancreatic cancer.

Filmography

References

External links

Official El Juramento Website 

1948 births
2022 deaths
Mexican telenovela actresses
Mexican television actresses
Mexican film actresses
Actresses from Guadalajara, Jalisco
20th-century Mexican actresses
21st-century Mexican actresses
OTI Festival presenters
Deaths from pancreatic cancer
Deaths from cancer in Florida